Wainikiti (Kiti) Bogidrau is a former president of the Fiji Netball Association (2010-2020), current president of the Oceania Netball Federation and a board member of World Netball.

Early life
Bogidrau is a Fijian. She obtained a BA in sociology in 2000, specializing in population studies and demography, from the University of the South Pacific in Suva, capital of Fiji, where she won four gold medals on graduation, including the Vice-Chancellor's gold medal for the most outstanding academic and community service record for a female student. She obtained an MA in Pacific Island Studies from the University of Hawaiʻi at Mānoa in Honolulu in 2004. She later received a post-graduate diploma in public administration from the same university. She married Major Setareki Bogidrau, a senior officer in Fiji's army.

Career
Bogidrau began her working career with three Fijian newspapers, the Daily Post, the Fiji Sun, and the Fiji Times. In 2006 she joined the Fiji National Provident Fund, the largest financial institution in Fiji, and in 2020 was head of research and product development at the Fund.

Netball administration
Bogidrau played netball from primary school, in secondary school, and later in club competition. She continued to play social netball in business-house competitions. From 2000 she began to work in netball administration on a voluntary basis and in 2010 she was appointed president of the Fiji Netball Association. She was elected president of the Oceania Netball Federation in 2019 and, on the basis of this role, became a member of the board of World Netball, becoming the first Fijian to hold these positions.

References

External links
Bogidrau addresses the World Netball Congress

Fijian people
Fijian women
Fijian netball administrators
University of the South Pacific alumni
University of Hawaiʻi at Mānoa alumni
Living people
Year of birth missing (living people)